Riverside County is a county located in the southern portion of the U.S. state of California. As of the 2020 census, the population was 2,418,185, making it the fourth-most populous county in California and the 10th-most populous in the United States. The name was derived from the city of Riverside, which is the county seat.

Riverside County is included in the Riverside-San Bernardino-Ontario Metropolitan Statistical Area, also known as the Inland Empire. The county is also included in the Los Angeles-Long Beach Combined Statistical Area.

Geographically, the county is mostly desert in the central and eastern portions, but has a Mediterranean climate in the western portion. Most of Joshua Tree National Park is located in the county. The resort cities of Palm Springs, Palm Desert, Indian Wells, La Quinta, Rancho Mirage, and Desert Hot Springs are all located in the Coachella Valley region of central Riverside County.

Between 2007 and 2011, large numbers of Los Angeles-area workers moved to the county to take advantage of more affordable housing. Along with neighboring San Bernardino County, it was one of the fastest-growing regions in the state prior to the recent changes in the regional economy. In addition, smaller, but significant, numbers of people have been moving into southwest Riverside County from the San Diego metropolitan area. The cities of Temecula and Murrieta accounted for 20% of the increase in population of the county between 2000 and 2007.

Etymology 

When Riverside County was formed in 1893 it was named for the city of Riverside, the county seat. The city, founded in 1870, received its name for its location beside the Santa Ana River.

History

Indigenous

The Indigenous peoples of the valleys, mountains and deserts of what is now Riverside County are the Serrano, the Payómkawichum, the Mohave, the Cupeno, the Chemehuevi, the Cahuilla, and the Tongva. The Aguanga and Temecula Basins, Elsinore Trough and eastern Santa Ana Mountains are the traditional homelands of the  Payómkawichum. The inland valleys in the Santa Rosa and San Jacinto Mountains and the desert of the Salton Sink are the traditional homelands of the Cahuilla.

Spanish era 
The first European settlement in the county was a Mission San Luis Rey de Francia estancia or farm at the Luiseño village of Temescal. In 1819, the Mission granted  Leandro Serrano permission to occupy the land for the purpose of grazing and farming, and Serrano established Rancho Temescal.  Serrano was mayordomo of San Antonio de Pala Asistencia for the Mission of San Luis Rey.

Mexican era 
With the signing of the Treaty of Cordoba in 1821, Mexico gained its independence from Spain, but the San Gabriel Mission near what is now Los Angeles, California, continued to expand, and established Rancho San Gorgonio in 1824. The ranch was to be one of the Mission's principle rancherias, and the most distant, and it occupied most of today's San Gorgonio Pass area.

Following the Mexican secularization act of 1833 by the First Mexican Republic, a series of rancho land grants were made throughout the state.  In the Riverside County this included; Rancho Jurupa in 1838, El Rincon in 1839, Rancho San Jacinto Viejo in 1842, Rancho San Jacinto y San Gorgonio in 1843, Ranchos La Laguna, Pauba, Temecula in 1844, Ranchos Little Temecula, Potreros de San Juan Capistrano in 1845, Ranchos San Jacinto Sobrante, La Sierra (Sepulveda), La Sierra (Yorba), Santa Rosa and San Jacinto Nuevo y Potrero in 1846.

New Mexican colonists founded the town of La Placita on the east side of the Santa Ana River at the northern extremity of what is now the city of Riverside in 1843.

American era 
When the initial 27 California counties were established in 1850, the area today known as Riverside County was divided between Los Angeles County and San Diego County. In 1853, the eastern part of Los Angeles County was used to create San Bernardino County. Between 1891 and 1893, several proposals and legislative attempts were put forth to form new counties in Southern California. These proposals included one for a Pomona County and one for a San Jacinto County. None of the proposals were adopted until a measure to create Riverside County was signed by Governor Henry H. Markham on March 11, 1893.

County formation 
The new county was created from parts of San Bernardino County and San Diego County. On May 2, 1893, seventy percent of voters approved the formation of Riverside County. Voters chose the city of Riverside as the county seat, also by a large margin. Riverside County was officially formed on May 9, 1893, when the Board of Commissioners filed the final canvass of the votes.

The county is also the location of the March Air Reserve Base, one of the oldest airfields continuously operated by the United States military. Established as the Alessandro Flying Training Field in February 1918, it was one of thirty-two U.S. Army Air Service training camps established after the United States entry into World War I in April 1917. The airfield was renamed March Field the following month for 2d Lieutenant Peyton C. March, Jr., the recently deceased son of the then-Army Chief of Staff, General Peyton C. March, who was killed in an air crash in Texas just fifteen days after being commissioned.  March Field remained an active Army Air Service, then U.S. Army Air Corps installation throughout the interwar period, later becoming a major installation of the U.S. Army Air Forces during World War II. Renamed March Air Force Base in 1947 following the establishment of the U.S. Air Force, it was a major Strategic Air Command (SAC) installation throughout the Cold War. In 1996, it was transferred to the Air Force Reserve Command and gained its current name as a major base for the Air Force Reserve and the California Air National Guard.

Riverside county was a major focal point of the Civil Rights Movements in the US, especially the African-American sections of Riverside and heavily Mexican-American communities of the Coachella Valley visited by Cesar Chavez of the farm labor union struggle.

Riverside county has also been a focus of modern Native American Gaming enterprises. In the early 1980s, the county government attempted to shut down small bingo halls operated by the Morongo Band of Cahuilla Mission Indians and the Cabazon Band of Mission Indians. The tribes joined forces and fought the county all the way to the U.S. Supreme Court, which ruled in the tribes' favor on February 25, 1987.  In turn, Congress enacted the Indian Gaming Regulatory Act in 1988 to establish a legal framework for the relationship between Indian gaming and state governments. Naturally, both tribes now operate large casinos in the county: the Morongo Casino, Resort & Spa and the Fantasy Springs Resort Casino adjacent to Spotlight 29 Casino.

The county's population surpassed one million people in 1990 (year-round, would be 1980 with seasonal residents) when the current trend of high population growth as a major real estate destination began in the 1970s. Once strictly a place for long-distance commuters to L.A. and later Orange County, the county and city of Riverside started becoming more of a place to establish new or relocated offices, corporations and finance centers in the late 1990s and 2000s. More light industry, manufacturing and truck distribution centers became major regional employers in the county.

Geography
It is the fourth-largest county in California by area. Riverside County, California is roughly the size of the State of New Jersey in total area. County government documents frequently cite the Colorado River town of Blythe as being a "three-hour drive" from the county seat, Riverside. Some view the areas west of San Gorgonio Pass as the Inland Empire portion of the county and the eastern part as either the Mojave Desert or Colorado Desert portion. There are probably at least three geomorphic provinces: the Inland Empire western portion, the Santa Rosa Mountains communities such as Reinhardt Canyon, and the desert region. Other possible subdivisions include tribal lands, the Colorado River communities, and the Salton Sea.

Flora and fauna

There is a diversity of flora and fauna within Riverside County. Vegetative plant associations feature many desert flora, but there are also forested areas within the county. The California endemic Blue oak, Quercus douglasii is at the southernmost part of its range in Riverside County.

National protected areas
 Cleveland National Forest (part)
 Coachella Valley National Wildlife Refuge
 Dos Palmas Preserve
 Joshua Tree National Park (part)
 San Bernardino National Forest (part)
 Sand to Snow National Monument (part)
 Santa Rosa and San Jacinto Mountains National Monument

There are 19 official wilderness areas in Riverside County that are part of the National Wilderness Preservation System. Some are integral parts of the above protected areas, most (11 of the 19) are managed solely by the Bureau of Land Management, and some share management between the BLM and the relevant other agencies. Some extend into neighboring counties:

 Agua Tibia Wilderness (part)
 Beauty Mountain Wilderness
 Big Maria Mountains Wilderness
 Cahuilla Mountain Wilderness
 Chuckwalla Mountains Wilderness
 Joshua Tree Wilderness (part)
 Little Chuckwalla Mountains Wilderness (part)
 Mecca Hills Wilderness
 Orocopia Mountains Wilderness
 Palen/McCoy Wilderness
 Palo Verde Mountains Wilderness (part)
 Pinto Mountains Wilderness
 Rice Valley Wilderness
 Riverside Mountains Wilderness
 San Gorgonio Wilderness (part)
 San Jacinto Wilderness
 San Mateo Canyon Wilderness (part)
 Santa Rosa Wilderness
 South Fork San Jacinto Wilderness

State parks
 California Citrus State Historic Park
 Lake Perris State Recreation Area
 Mount San Jacinto State Park

County parks and trails
 Hurkey Creek Park
 Idyllwild Park
 Indio Hills Palms
 Jensen Alvarado Ranch
 Lake Cahuilla Recreation Area 
 Lake Skinner Recreation Area
 McCall Memorial Equestrian Park
 Santa Rosa Plateau

Demographics

2020 census

Note: the US Census treats Hispanic/Latino as an ethnic category. This table excludes Latinos from the racial categories and assigns them to a separate category. Hispanics/Latinos can be of any race.

2011

Places by population, race, and income

2010
The 2010 United States Census reported that Riverside County had a population of 2,189,641. The racial makeup of Riverside County was 1,335,147 (61.0%) White (40.7% Non-Hispanic White), 140,543 (6.4%) African American, 23,710 (1.1%) Native American, 130,468 (6.0%) Asian (2.3% Filipino, 0.8% Chinese, 0.7% Vietnamese, 0.6% Korean, 0.5% Indian, 0.2% Japanese, 0.1% Cambodian, 0.1% Laotian, 0.1% Pakistani), 6,874 (0.3%) Pacific Islander, 448,235 (20.5%) from other races, and 104,664 (4.8%) from two or more races. Hispanic or Latino of any race were 995,257 persons (45.5%); 39.5% of Riverside County is Mexican, 0.8% Salvadoran, 0.7% Honduran, 0.6% Puerto Rican, 0.3% Cuban, and 0.2% Nicaraguan.

2000
As of the census of 2000, there were 1,545,387 people, 506,218 households, and 372,576 families residing in the county. There were 584,674 housing units at an average density of 81 per square mile (31/km2). The racial makeup of the county was 65.6% White, 6.2% Black or African American, 1.2% Native American, 3.7% Asian, 0.3% Pacific Islander, 18.7% from other races, and 4.4% from two or more races. 36.2% of the population were Hispanic or Latino of any race. 9.2% were of German, 6.9% English, 6.1% Irish and 5.0% American ancestry according to Census 2000. 67.2% spoke English and 27.7% Spanish as their first language.

In 2006 the county had a population of 2,026,803, up 31.2% since 2000. In 2005 45.8% of the population was non-Hispanic whites. The percentages of African Americans, Asians and Native Americans remained relatively similar to their 2000 figures. The percentage of Pacific Islanders had majorly risen to 0.4. Hispanics now constituted 41% of the population.

There were 506,218 households, out of which 38.90% had children under the age of 18 living with them, 56.5% were married couples living together, 12.0% had a female householder with no husband present, and 26.4% were non-families. 20.7% of all households were made up of individuals, and 9.3% had someone living alone who was 65 years of age or older. The average household size was 3.0 and the average family size was 3.5.

In the county, the population was spread out, with 30.3% under the age of 18, 9.2% from 18 to 24, 28.9% from 25 to 44, 18.9% from 45 to 64, and 12.7% who were 65 years of age or older. The median age was 33 years. For every 100 females, there were 99.1 males. For every 100 females age 18 and over, there were 96.8 males.

The median income for a household in the county was $42,887, and the median income for a family was $48,409. Males had a median income of $38,639 versus $28,032 for females. The per capita income for the county was $18,689. About 10.7% of families and 14.2% of the population were below the poverty line, including 18.5% of those under age 18 and 7.6% of those age 65 or over.

Government and law enforcement

Government
Riverside County is organized as a General Law County under the provision of the California Government Code.  The county has five supervisorial districts, and one supervisor is elected from each district every four years.

In 1999, the County Board of Supervisors approved a multimillion-dollar planning effort to create the Riverside County Integrated Plan (RCIP) which was to encompass a completely new General Plan, regional transportation plan (CETAP) and Habitat Conservation Plan. The resultant General Plan adopted in 2003 was considered groundbreaking for its multidisciplinary approach to land use and conservation planning.

Courts
The Riverside Superior Court is the state trial court for Riverside County with 14 courthouses: Riverside Historic Courthouse, Riverside Hall of Justice, Riverside Family Law Court, Riverside Juvenile Court, Southwest Justice Center – Murrieta, Moreno Valley Court, Banning Court, Hemet Court, Corona Court, Temecula Court, Larson Justice Center – Indio, Indio Juvenile Court, Palm Springs Court and Blythe Court.

The main courthouse is the Riverside Historic Courthouse.  This landmark, erected in 1903, was modeled after the Grand and Petit Palais in Paris, France.  The courthouse, designed by Los Angeles architects Burnham and Bliesner, has a classical design – including a great hall that connects all the departments (courtrooms). In 1994, the courthouse was closed for seismic retrofits due to the 1992 Landers and 1994 Northridge earthquakes.  The courthouse was reopened and rededicated in September 1998.

Riverside County hands down 1 in 6 death sentences in the US, in spite of it having less than 1% of the population.

Law enforcement

Sheriff
The Riverside County Sheriff provides court protection, jail administration, and coroner services for all of Riverside County. It provides patrol, detective, and other police services for the unincorporated areas of the county plus by contract to the cities and towns of Coachella, Eastvale, Indian Wells, Jurupa Valley, La Quinta, Lake Elsinore, Moreno Valley, Norco, Palm Desert, Perris, Rancho Mirage, San Jacinto, Temecula and Wildomar.  The Morongo Indian Reservation also contracts with the Sheriff's Office to provide police services to the reservation.

Municipal Police
Municipal departments within the county are Banning, Beaumont, Blythe, Calimesa, Cathedral City, Corona, Desert Hot Springs, Hemet, Indio, Menifee, Murrieta, Palm Springs, Riverside, Riverside Community College.

Politics

Voter registration

Overview
Prior to 2008, Riverside County was historically a Republican stronghold in presidential and congressional elections. Between its creation in 1893 and 2004, it voted for the Democratic presidential nominee only three times: Franklin D. Roosevelt in 1936 (by a margin of 337 votes, or 0.99%), Lyndon B. Johnson in 1964 (by a margin of 19,363 votes, or 13.65%) and Bill Clinton in 1992 (by a margin of 6,784 votes, or 1.58%). In 1932, it was one of only two counties on the entire West Coast to vote for Republican president Herbert Hoover over Roosevelt.

However, in 2008, consistent with a trend in California and nationwide suburbs towards the Democratic Party, Barack Obama narrowly carried the county with 14,976 votes, a 2.32% margin over Republican John McCain. Mitt Romney lost the county in 2012 in a plurality. Hillary Clinton continued the Democratic win streak in the 2016 election, and became the first and only losing Democratic nominee to win the county. Former Democratic Vice President Joe Biden won the county outright in 2020 with a 79,196 lead over President Donald Trump, the largest ever raw vote margin for a Democrat.

Despite the federal trend towards Democrats, Republicans have continued to win Riverside County at the state level. During the 2018 gubernatorial election, Republican John H. Cox (50.2%) narrowly defeated Democrat Gavin Newsom (49.8%) in the county despite losing in a landslide statewide. During the gubernatorial recall against Newsom held three years later, Riverside County narrowly voted in favor of recalling Newsom despite the recall failing in another landslide.

 

  
 
 

 
 

 
  
 

In the United States House of Representatives, Riverside County is split between 6 congressional districts:
 
 
 
 
  and
 .

In the California State Senate, the county is split between 4 legislative districts:
 ,
 ,
 , and
 .

In the California State Assembly, the county is split between 6 legislative districts:

 ,
 ,
 ,
 ,
 , and
 .

Riverside County voted 64.8% in favor of Proposition 8 which amended the California Constitution to ban same-sex marriages. Only the city of Palm Springs voted against the measure.

Crime
The following table includes the number of incidents reported and the rate per 1,000 persons for each type of offense.

Cities by population and crime rates

Education

Universities and colleges

 Azusa Pacific University – Murrieta
 Brandman University, part of the Chapman University System – Moreno Valley, Palm Desert, Riverside and Temecula
 California Baptist University – Riverside
 California Southern Law School – Riverside
 California State University, San Bernardino, Palm Desert Campus – Palm Desert
 California State University, San Marcos, Temecula Satellite Campus – Temecula
 College of the Desert – Palm Desert and Indio
 La Sierra University – Riverside
 Mayfield College – Cathedral City
 Mt. San Jacinto College – Banning, Menifee, San Jacinto, Temecula
 Olivet University – Anza
 Palo Verde College – Blythe
 Riverside Community College District
 Riverside City College
 Moreno Valley College
 Norco College
 Santa Barbara Business College – Palm Desert
 University of California, Riverside – Palm Desert and Riverside
 University of Phoenix – Murrieta and Palm Desert

K-12 schools
 Public school districts

K-12 unified:
 Alvord Unified School District
 Banning Unified School District
 Beaumont Unified School District
 Coachella Valley Unified School District
 Colton Joint Unified School District
 Corona-Norco Unified School District
 Desert Center Unified School District
 Desert Sands Unified School District
 Hemet Unified School District
 Jurupa Unified School District
 Lake Elsinore Unified School District
 Moreno Valley Unified School District
 Murrieta Valley Unified School District
 Palm Springs Unified School District
 Palo Verde Unified School District
 Riverside Unified School District
 San Jacinto Unified School District
 Temecula Valley Unified School District
 Val Verde Unified School District
 Yucaipa-Calimesa Joint Unified School District

Secondary:
 Perris Union High School District

Elementary:
 Menifee Union School District
 Nuview Union Elementary School District
 Perris Elementary School District
 Romoland Elementary School District

 State-operated schools
 California School for the Deaf, Riverside

 Bureau of Indian Education-operated schools
 Sherman Indian High School

Transportation

Major highways

Public transportation
 Riverside Transit Agency serves the western third of Riverside County, as far east as Banning.
 SunLine Transit Agency serves Palm Springs and the Coachella Valley area.
 Palo Verde Valley Transit Agency provides service in Blythe, near the Arizona border.
 Pass Transit serves the San Gorgonio Pass communities.
 Corona Cruiser serves the city of Corona.
 Riverside County is also served by Greyhound buses.

Amtrak trains stop in Riverside and Palm Springs, and Amtrak California provides bus connections to the San Joaquins in Riverside, Beaumont, Palm Springs, Thousand Palms, Indio, Moreno Valley, Perris, Sun City, and Hemet.

Metrolink trains serve nine stations in Riverside County: Riverside-Downtown, Riverside-La Sierra, North Main-Corona, West Corona, Jurupa Valley/Pedley, Hunter Park/UCR, March Field-Moreno Valley, Perris-Downtown, and Perris-South. These trains provide service to Orange, San Bernardino and Los Angeles counties seven days a week, with a primarily commuter-oriented schedule.

Airports

Military air bases
 March Air Reserve Base (former March Air Force Base)

Commercial airports
 Palm Springs International Airport

General aviation airports

 Banning Municipal Airport
 Bermuda Dunes Airport
 Blythe Airport
 Corona Municipal Airport
 Flabob Airport, Riverside
 French Valley Airport (Temecula Valley)
 Hemet-Ryan Airport (San Jacinto Valley)
 Jacqueline Cochran Regional Airport, Thermal (Coachella Valley)
 Perris Valley Airport
 Riverside Municipal Airport

Military installations
 Active
 Chocolate Mountain Aerial Gunnery Range
 March Air Reserve Base
 Naval Weapons Station Seal Beach Detachment Norco
 Naval Surface Warfare Center, Corona Division
 Historical
 Desert Training Center
 Blythe Army Airfield
 Desert Center Army Airfield
 Palm Springs Army Airfield
 Rice Army Airfield
 Shaver's Summit Army Airfield
 Thermal Army Airfield (Also named Naval Air Facility Thermal (historical))
 Hemet Army Airfield

Points of interest

 Empire Polo Club, location of the Coachella and Stagecoach music festivals
 Gold Base, international headquarters of the Church of Scientology and Golden Era Productions
 Indian Wells Tennis Garden
 Joshua Tree National Park
 Living Desert Zoo and Gardens
 March Field Air Museum
 Mission Inn Hotel & Spa
 Orange Empire Railway Museum
 Orocopia Mountains Wilderness
 Palm Springs Aerial Tramway and Mount San Jacinto State Park
 Palm Springs Desert Museum
 Ramona Bowl, Home of The Ramona Pageant
 Riverside County fair grounds, location of the Riverside County Fair and National Date Festival
 Riverside National Cemetery, including the Medal of Honor Memorial
 Salton Sea State Recreation Area
 Santa Rosa Plateau
 Sunnylands Center & Gardens
 Temecula Valley AVA Wine Region
 Western Science Center

Communities

Cities

Unincorporated communities

 Aguanga
 Alberhill
 Alessandro
 Anza
 Arnold Heights
 Bermuda Dunes
 Bonnie Bell
 Box Springs
 Cabazon
 Cactus City
 Cahuilla
 Cahuilla Hills
 Cherry Valley
 Chiriaco Summit
 Coronita
 Desert Beach
 Desert Center
 Desert Edge
 Desert Palms
 East Hemet
 Edgemont
 El Cariso
 El Cerrito
 El Sobrante
 Fern Valley
 French Valley
 Garnet
 Gilman Hot Springs
 Good Hope
 Green Acres
 Highgrove
 Home Gardens
 Homeland
 Idyllwild
 Indio Hills
 La Cresta
 Lake Mathews
 Lake Riverside
 Lake Tamarisk
 Lakeland Village
 Lakeview
 March ARB
 Mead Valley
 Meadowbrook
 Mecca
 Mesa Verde
 Mountain Center
 North Palm Springs
 North Shore
 Nuevo
 Oasis
 Pine Cove
 Pinyon Pines
 Radec
 Rancho Capistrano
 Ripley
 Romoland
 Sage
 Sky Valley
 Snow Creek
 Temescal Valley
 Thermal
 Thomas Mountain
 Thousand Palms
 Valerie
 Valle Vista
 Vista Santa Rosa
 Warm Springs
 Whitewater
 Winchester
 Woodcrest

Ghost towns

 Bergman
 Dos Palmas
 Eagle Mountain
 Eden
 Fertilla
 Hell
 La Placita
 Leon
 Midland
 Pinacate
 Saahatpa
 Temescal
 Terra Cotta
 Willow Springs Station

Indian reservations
Riverside County has 12 federally recognized Indian reservations, which ties it with Sandoval County, New Mexico, for second most of any county in the United States. (Sandoval County, however, has two additional joint-use areas, shared between reservations. San Diego County, California has the most, with 18 reservations.)

 Agua Caliente Indian Reservation
 Augustine Indian Reservation
 Cabazon Indian Reservation
 Cahuilla Indian Reservation
 Colorado River Indian Reservation (partly in La Paz County, Arizona and San Bernardino County, California)
 Morongo Indian Reservation
 Pechanga Indian Reservation
 Ramona Village
 Santa Rosa Indian Reservation
 Soboba Band of Mission Indians
 Torres-Martinez Indian Reservation (partly in Imperial County, California)
 Twenty-Nine Palms Indian Reservation (partly in San Bernardino County, California)

Population ranking
The population ranking of the following table is based on the 2020 census of Riverside County.

† county seat

Climate

See also

 USS Riverside (APA-102), a World War II attack transport
 List of cemeteries in Riverside County, California
National Register of Historic Places listings in Riverside County, California
 KPRO (California), a radio station that served the county

Notes

References

Bibliography
 Fitch, Robert J. (1993). Profile of a Century: Riverside County, California, 1893–1993. Riverside County Historical Commission Press.  pp. 300. 
 Gunther, Jane Davies. Riverside County, California, Place Names; Their Origins and Their Stories, Riverside, CA, 1984. LOC catalog number: 84–72920.
 
 
  (a reprint of the first three chapters of Along the Old Roads.)

Further reading
 
 Gunther, Jane Davies (1984). Riverside County, California, Place Names. Their Origins and Their Stories: Rubidoux Printing Co. 1984. LCCN 84-72920
 History of San Bernardino and Riverside Counties, Volume 1.
 History of San Bernardino and Riverside Counties, Volume 2.
 History of San Bernardino and Riverside Counties Volume 3.

External links

 
 Official Riverside County, Department of Information Technology website
 Official Riverside County Sheriff website
 Official Riverside County Fire Dept. website
 Official Riverside County District Attorney's Office website
 Official Riverside County Regional Parks District website
 

 
California counties
Inland Empire
Greater Los Angeles
Counties in Southern California
1893 establishments in California
Populated places established in 1893
Majority-minority counties in California